Patrik Urbanec (born 9 October 1993) is a Czech professional ice hockey player. He is currently playing for HC Vítkovice of the Czech Extraliga.

Urbanec made his Czech Extraliga debut playing with HC Zlín during the 2012–13 Czech Extraliga season.

References

External links

1993 births
Living people
HC Vítkovice players
PSG Berani Zlín players
Sportspeople from Zlín
Czech ice hockey defencemen